The Istana Negara (English: National Palace) is the official residence of the Yang di-Pertuan Agong, the monarch of Malaysia. It is located along Jalan Tuanku Abdul Halim (formerly Jalan Duta) near Taman Duta, northwestern Kuala Lumpur. The palace opened in 2011 and replaced the old Istana Negara which was located at a different compound in central Kuala Lumpur.

The palace complex has an area of 97.65 hectares, 22 domes, and is split into three main portions: the Formal Component, Royal Component and Administration Component.

The whole palace complex has 3 main entry points from Jalan Duta, Changkat Semantan and Jalan Sri Hartamas 1 which are named as Pintu 1 Istana Negara (Gate 1 of Istana Negara), Pintu 2 Istana Negara  (Gate 2 of Istana Negara) and Pintu 3 Istana Negara (Gate 3 of Istana Negara) respectively.

History
The site where the palace is located has been gazetted for such purpose in 1976, and numerous contractors have been involved with the initial planning. The need for a new palace, according to the then-Works Minister Samy Vellu, has been pressing due to space constraints in the old palace. The Balai Rong Seri (throne room) of the old palace was also used as the dining and meeting rooms. The site is 96.52 hectares and situated on a hill, of which according to Malaysian Public Works Department (JKR) director-general Dr Amer Hamzah Mohd Yunus, only 28 hectares will be used for the development of the palace complex while the rest is allocated as a forest reserve and a buffer zone for safety purposes.

Construction began in November 2007 and cost RM812 million to build. The complex was headed by the 12th Yang di-Pertuan Agong, Tuanku Syed Sirajuddin of Perlis, serving the mandate trusted upon him by The Malay Rules Council as to overlook the affairs and activities of the palace's construction. Tuanku Syed Sirajuddin had also officiated the palace's new official site on 13 November 2006. The complex incorporates Islamic and Malay architectural elements, following designs by architect firm Kumpulan Seni Reka Sdn Bhd and built by construction firm Maya Maju Sdn Bhd. The palace complex was slated for completion in 2009 but was only completed in September 2011.

The royal household began moving its operations to the new palace complex in phases beginning 19 October, ending with a flag-raising ceremony on 15 November.

The 13th Yang di-Pertuan Agong, Tuanku Mizan Zainal Abidin of Terengganu was the first King to use the palace while the 14th Yang di-Pertuan Agong, Tuanku Abdul Halim Mu'adzam Shah of Kedah was the first King to have his installation ceremony held there.

Interior

The formal component consists the following 
 Main Lobby 
 Banquet Hall Pre-Function
 Banquet Hall
 Singgahsana (Main Throne)
 Singgahsana Kecil (Small Throne)
 Prayers Hall
 Dewan Seri Negara (Royal Waiting Hall 1)
 Dewan Seri Maharaja (Royal Waiting Hall 2)
 Dewan Seri Mahkota (VVIP Waiting Hall)
 Audience Hall
 Audience Chamber
 Bilik Mesyuarat Majlis Raja-Raja (The Conference Of Rulers Meeting Chamber)
 Kitchen Facility

The royal component consists the following 
 Royal Guest Suites 1 - 9
 Royal Bath (Royal Swimming Pool) 
 Royal Kitchen 
 Royal Dining Chamber
 Royal Private Garden
 Royal Wing's Lobby
 Royal Multipurpose Hall
 Foyer At The Royal Wing
 Office of the Seri Paduka Baginda Yang di-Pertuan Agong 
 Office of the Seri Paduka Baginda Raja Permaisuri Agong 
 Seri Paduka Baginda Yang di-Pertuan Agong & Seri Paduka Baginda Raja Permaisuri Agong Meeting Room
 Guest Lounge
 Guest Lounge on the First Floor of The Royal Wing
 Guest Lounge on the 2nd Floor of The Royal Wing
 Yang Di-Pertuan Agong's Personal Library
 Guest Library
 Mini Theatre
 TV Room
 Treatment Room
 Gymnasium, Sauna & Steam
 Dentistry Facility

The administration component consists the following 
 Offices of the palace administrators
 Praying chamber 
 the Support Building 
 the Security Office
 Multipurpose hall
 Emergency room
 Helipad
 Quistry area
 Horse stable
 Swimming pool 
 Sports recreation area
 Ceremonial cannons

See also

 Istana Negara, Jalan Istana, is the former national palace of Malaysia's Yang di-Pertuan Agong in Kuala Lumpur. 
 Istana Melawati, Second palace of Malaysia's Yang di-Pertuan Agong situated in Putrajaya.

References

External links

Royal residences in Malaysia
Negara, Jalan Duta
Negara, Jalan Duta
2011 establishments in Malaysia
Prime Minister's Department (Malaysia)